The 1945 Western Michigan Broncos football team represented Michigan College of Education (later renamed Western Michigan University) as an independent during the 1945 college football season.  In their fourth season under head coach John Gill, the Broncos compiled a 4–3 record and outscored their opponents, 147 to 105.  The team played its home games at Waldo Stadium in Kalamazoo, Michigan. Tackle Ned Stuits received the team's most outstanding player award.

Schedule

References

Western Michigan
Western Michigan Broncos football seasons
Western Michigan Broncos football